[Fructose-bisphosphate aldolase]-lysine N-methyltransferase is an enzyme that catalyses the following chemical reaction

 3 S-adenosyl-L-methionine + [fructose-bisphosphate aldolase]-L-lysine  3 S-adenosyl-L-homocysteine + [fructose-bisphosphate aldolase]-N6,N6,N6-trimethyl-L-lysine

The enzyme methylates a conserved lysine in the C-terminal part of higher plant fructose-bisphosphate aldolase (EC 4.1.2.13).

Nomenclature 
The systematic name of the enzyme is:
 S-adenosyl-L-methionine:(fructose-bisphosphate aldolase)-lysine N6-methyltransferase

Other names are:
 rubisco methyltransferase
 ribulose-bisphosphate-carboxylase/oxygenase N-methyltransferase
 ribulose-1,5-bisphosphate carboxylase/oxygenase large subunit epsilonN-methyltransferase
 S-adenosyl-L-methionine:[3-phospho-D-glycerate-carboxy-lyase (dimerizing)]-lysine 6-N-methyltransferase'')

See also
 Methyllysine
 RuBisCO
 SET domain

References

External links 
 

EC 2.1.1